MS Cruise Roma, owned and operated by Grimaldi Lines, is the longest cruiseferry in the world. It was built at Fincantieri in Castellammare di Stabia, Italy.

She was the first of a series of four sister ships, the others being Cruise Barcelona (also operated by Grimaldi Lines), Cruise Europa and Cruise Olympia (operated by Minoan Lines). They are the largest ferries under Italian flag.

Before the lengthening the ship had 470 cabins, including 60 suites, one à la carte restaurant, a self-service restaurant, a cafeteria, an ice-cream parlor, a swimming pool, a disco, a casino, a conference room, a boutique, a shopping center.

Cruise Roma is operated on the route linking Civitavecchia, Italy to Barcelona, Spain via Porto Torres (Sardinia), together with her sister Cruise Barcelona.

The ferry has been lengthened at Fincantieri shipyard in Palermo in February, 2019. Also, twin ferry Cruise Barcelona will be lengthened within 2019.

See also
Largest ferries of Europe

References

External links
 

Ferries of Italy
Cruiseferries
Ships built in Castellammare di Stabia
2007 ships
Ships built by Fincantieri

it:Cruise Roma